Ones and Zeros may refer to:

 Ones and Zeros (Immaculate Machine album)
 Ones and Zeros (Young Guns album)
 "eps1.1_ones-and-zer0es.mpeg", a 2015 episode of Mr. Robot

See also
 Zeros and Ones, a 2021 film
 "Zeroes and Ones", a song by Jesus Jones
 Binary number